Jail Yatra is a 1981 Indian Bollywood film directed by Bhappi Sonie. It stars Ashok Kumar, Vinod Khanna and  Reena Roy in pivotal roles.

Cast 
 Ashok Kumar...Ramnath Verma
 Vinod Khanna...Raju Verma
 Reena Roy...Shanu
 Nirupa Roy...Radha Verma
 Amjad Khan...Kuldeep
 Anwar Hussain...Police Inspector
 Heena Kausar...Roopa
 Dhumal...Constable at the beach

Soundtrack 
Lyrics: Majrooh Sultanpuri

External links 

1980s Hindi-language films
1981 films
Films scored by R. D. Burman
Indian crime films
Indian prison films
Films directed by Bhappi Sonie
1980s prison films